Panmixia (or panmixis) means random mating. A panmictic population is one where all individuals are potential partners. This assumes that there are no mating restrictions, neither genetic nor behavioural, upon the population and that therefore all recombination is possible. The Wahlund effect assumes that the overall population is panmictic.

In genetics, random mating involves the mating of individuals regardless of any physical, genetic or social preference. In other words, the mating between two organisms is not influenced by any environmental, hereditary or social interaction. Hence, potential mates have an equal chance of being selected. Random mating is a factor assumed in the Hardy–Weinberg principle and is distinct from lack of natural selection: in viability selection for instance, selection occurs before mating.

Description
In simple terms, panmixia (or panmicticism) is the ability of individuals in a population to interbreed without restrictions; individuals are able to move about freely within their habitat, possibly over a range of hundreds to thousands of miles, and thus breed with other members of the population.

To signify the importance of this, imagine several different finite populations of the same species (for example: a grazing herbivore), isolated from each other by some physical characteristic of the environment (dense forest areas separating grazing lands). As time progresses, natural selection and genetic drift will slowly move each population toward genetic differentiation that would make each population genetically unique (that could eventually lead to speciation events or extirpation).

However, if the separating factor is removed before this happens (e.g. a road is cut through the forest), and the individuals are allowed to move about freely, the individual populations will still be able to interbreed. As the species's populations interbreed over time, they become more genetically uniform, functioning again as a single panmictic population.

In attempting to describe the mathematical properties of structured populations, Sewall Wright proposed a "factor of Panmixia" (P) to include in the equations describing the gene frequencies in a population, and accounting for a population's tendency towards panmixia, while a "factor of Fixation" (F) would account for a population's departure from the Hardy–Weinberg expectation, due to less than panmictic mating. In this formulation, the two quantities are complementary, i.e. P = 1 − F. From this factor of fixation, he later developed the F statistics.

Background information 
In a panmictic species, all of the individuals of a single species are potential partners, and the species gives no mating restrictions throughout the population. Panmixia can also be referred to as random mating, referring to a population that randomly chooses their mate, rather than sorting between the adults of the population.

Panmixia allows for species to reach genetic diversity through gene flow more efficiently than monandry species. However, outside population factors, like drought and limited food sources, can affect the way any species will mate. When scientists examine species mating to understand their mating style, they look at factors like genetic markers, genetic differentiation, and gene pool.

Panmictic species 

A panmictic population of Monostroma latissimum, a marine green algae, shows sympatric speciation in southwest Japanese islands. Although panmictic, the population is diversifying. Dawson's Burrowing bee, Amegilla dawsoni, may be forced to aggregate in common mating areas due to uneven resource distribution in its harsh desert environment. Pantala flavescens should be considered as a global panmictic population.

Related experiments and species 

 Anguilla rostrate, or the American eel, exhibits panmixia throughout the entire species. This allows the eel to have phenotypic variation in their offspring and survive in a wide range of environmental conditions
 In 2016, BMC Evolutionary Biology conducted a study on Pachygrapsus marmoratus, the marbled crab, marking them as panmictic species. The study claimed that the crabs' mating behavior is characterized by genetic differentiation due to geographic breaks across its distribution range and not panmixia
 In a heterogeneous environment such as the forests of Oregon, United States, Douglas squirrels (Tamiasciurus douglasii) exhibit local patterns of adaptation. In a study conducted by Chaves (2014) a population along an entire transect was found to be panmictic. Traits observed in this study included skull shape, fur color, etc. 
 Swordfish based in the Indian Ocean (Xiphias gladius) have been found to be a single panmictic population. Markers used in the study carried out by Muths et al (2013) found large spatial and temporal homogeneity in genetic structure satisfactory in order to consider the swordfish a singular panmictic population.

See also 
 Assortative mating (one form of non-random mating)
 Population genetics
Monogamy: A mating system in which one male mates with just one female, and one female mates with just one male, in breeding season 
Polygyny: A mating system in which a male fertilizes the eggs of several partners in breeding season
Sexual selection: A form of natural selection that occurs when individuals vary in their ability to compete with others for mates or to attract members of the opposite sex
Fitness: A measure of the genes contributed to the next generation by an individual, often stated in terms of the number of surviving offspring produced by the individual

References

Further reading
 
 

Population
Population genetics